For the Italian artist born in 1942, see Piero Gilardi.

Pier Celestino Gilardi (16 September 1837 – 4 October 1905) was an Italian painter and sculptor.

Early life and education
Born in Campertogno, the son of a sculptor, Gilardi studied at the Technical School of carving in Varallo and then, thanks to a scholarship of the Collegio Caccia of Novara, he enrolled at the Accademia Albertina in Turin, studying painting under Andrea Gastaldi. He held his first exhibitions in 1862.

Career 

Between 1873 and 1884 Gilardi was assistant of Gastaldi at the Accademia Albertina, and in 1884 was promoted to the role of professor of drawing. In 1889 he succeeded to Gastaldi as professor of painting.

Initially interested in historical subjects, starting from the second half of the 1860s Gilardi eventually specialized in genre painting, and from the middle of the 1870s focused in often humorous depictions of elderly subjects and of church everyday life. He got a large popularity due to the painting Hodie mihi cras tibi (1884), now in the Modern Art Gallery of Turin.

Among his pupils were Giovanni Guarlotti and Giovanni Rava.

Notable work 
One of Gilardi's notable paintings is the 1877 piece A Visit to the Gallery, which the University of Michigan Museum of Art acquired in 1895. The painting depicts a group of young women looking at a nude classical female statue, possibly the Venus de Medici at the Uffizi Gallery in Florence. Molly Peacock's poem "Girl and Friends View Naked Goddess" is directly inspired by this painting.

References

External links 
  

1837 births
1905 deaths
People from Campertogno
19th-century Italian sculptors
Italian male sculptors
19th-century Italian painters
19th-century Italian male artists
Italian male painters
20th-century Italian painters
20th-century Italian male artists
Accademia Albertina alumni
Academic staff of Accademia Albertina
Italian genre painters